Tappahannock Historic District is a national historic district located at Tappahannock, Essex County, Virginia. It encompasses 14 contributing buildings dating from the 18th through late-19th centuries.  They are the Customs House (c. 1750), Scot's Arms Tavern, Five Cents and Dollar Store, Ritchie House, Beale Memorial Baptist Church (Early Essex County Court House; 1728, 1814), Old Clerk's Office (c. 1808), Essex County Court House (1848, 1926), Debtor's Prison (c. 1769), Henley House (c. 1757), Anderton House (c. 1750), Brockenbrough House, St. Margaret's Hall, Roane-Wright House (c. 1850), and St. John's Episcopal Church (1837-1849).

It was listed on the National Register of Historic Places in 1973.

References

External links

Old Customs House, 109 Prince Street, Tappahannock, Essex County, VA: 1 photo at Historic American Buildings Survey
Old Lawyer's Office, 321 Prince Street, Tappahannock, Essex County, VA: 1 photo at Historic American Buildings Survey
Ritchie House, 227 Prince Street, Tappahannock, Essex County, VA: 1 photo and 4 measured drawings at Historic American Buildings Survey

Historic American Buildings Survey in Virginia
Historic districts on the National Register of Historic Places in Virginia
Colonial architecture in the United States
Greek Revival architecture in Virginia
Gothic Revival architecture in Virginia
Buildings and structures in Essex County, Virginia
National Register of Historic Places in Essex County, Virginia